is a railway station on the Kagoshima Main Line, operated by JR Kyushu in Chikugo, Fukuoka Prefecture, Japan.

Lines 

Layout 
The station consists of a side and an island platform serving three tracks at grade. The station building is built under the elevated structure of the Kyushu Shinkansen which does not stop at the station. It houses a waiting room, a staffed ticket window and a mini-convenience store. Access to the island platform is by means of a footbridge which is equipped with elevators.

Management of the station has been outsourced to the JR Kyushu Tetsudou Eigyou Co., a wholly owned subsidiary of JR Kyushu specialising in station services. It staffs the ticket counter which is equipped with a Midori no Madoguchi facility.

Adjacent stations

History
In the next phase of expansion, the track was extended south to Takase (now ) opening as the new southern terminus on 1 April 1891. Hainuzuka was opened on the same day as one of several intermediate stations on the new stretch of track. When the Kyushu Railway was nationalized on 1 July 1907, Japanese Government Railways (JGR) took over control of the station. On 12 October 1909, the station became part of the Hitoyoshi Main Line and then on 21 November 1909, part of the Kagoshima Main Line. With the privatization of Japanese National Railways (JNR), the successor of JGR, on 1 April 1987, JR Kyushu took over control of the station.

Passenger statistics
In fiscal 2016, the station was used by an average of 3,102 passengers daily (boarding passengers only), and it ranked 60th among the busiest stations of JR Kyushu.

References

External links
Hainuzuka Station (JR Kyushu)

Railway stations in Fukuoka Prefecture
Railway stations in Japan opened in 1891